Mliha is a village in the commune of M'Tsangamouji on Mayotte.

References

Populated places in Mayotte